Arcana is a 1972 Italian horror-drama film written and directed by Giulio Questi.

Plot 
In a neighborhood in Milan, Ms. Tarantino, a widow, lives with her son and dedicates herself to practices of spiritualism. Convinced that his mother knows the true secrets of magic and not just some tricks, the son forces her to reveal them. He will use them against a young girl to be married, Marisa, and he will also spread panic in the neighbourhood, causing accidents of all kinds.

Cast 
Lucia Bosé: Miss Tarantino
Maurizio Degli Esposti: The Son
Tina Aumont: Marisa

Production
Giulio Questi's new film was first announced in mid-1970 by Lucia Bosé who announced her next film would be titled Amanda a mysterious mother, a fortune teller, and a sorceress." Filming was done in Milan between June and July 1971 with the title changed to Arcana.

Release
Arcana was released in 1972. Film historian Roberto Curti described the film as a commercial disaster as the distributor D.D.E. went bankrupt when they were still printing copies of the film. Only five prints of the film were distributed across Italy and it did not play in any major cities.

References

Footnotes

Sources

External links

Italian horror films
Films directed by Giulio Questi
1972 horror films
1972 films
Films set in Milan
Films shot in Milan
Films about abortion
Films scored by Berto Pisano
1970s Italian films